Gerardo Arturo Gordillo Olivero (born 17 August 1994) is a Guatemalan professional footballer who plays as a centre-back for Brazilian club Juventude and captains the Guatemala national team.

Club career
Born in Guatemala City, Gordillo began his career at Antigua before joining Cypriot side Enosis Neon Paralimni. He appeared in his first match on 29 September 2013 against AEK Larnaca as an unused substitute. After not seeing any playing time for the club, Gordillo returned to Guatemala and joined Deportivo Marquense. He made his debut for the club on 13 March 2014 against Comunicaciones, coming on as an 81st-minute substitute for Jonny Brown as the match ended in a 1–1 draw.

After playing one season for the club, Gordillo moved abroad again, this time joining Battipagliese in Italy. After spending a season in Italy, Gordillo returned again to Guatemala and joined his former youth club Antigua. He made his debut for the club on 11 March 2015 against Deportivo Coatepeque in which he started during a 1–0 victory for the club. During his second season with the club, he helped Antigua become champions of the 2015–16 Apertura. He started for Antigua in the first leg of the finals against Guastatoya, earning a yellow card in the 57th minute as his side succumbed to a 2–1 defeat. He then came off the bench as a substitute in the second leg on 20 December 2015 as Antigua won 2–0 and 3–2 on aggregate.

Comunicaciones
On 10 June 2016, it was announced that Gordillo had signed with Comunicaciones. After starting a couple matches from the bench, Gordillo made his debut for the club on 5 February 2017 against his former club Deportivo Marquense. He started as the match ended in a 1–1 draw.

The next season, on 27 August 2017, Gordillo would score his first professional goal against Suchitepéquez. His 79th-minute goal was the second in a 2–0 victory.

Two seasons later, on 2 August 2019, Gordillo made his international club debut in the CONCACAF League against the Honduran side Marathón. He started and scored a goal in the 47th minute as Comunicaciones won 2–1. He would go on to help Comunicaciones qualify for the 2020 CONCACAF Champions League via finishing as the second best quarter-finalist side. In the process, Gordillo also earned a spot in the best eleven for the CONCACAF League.

On 20 February 2020, Gordillo started in Comunicaciones opening match of the Champions League against Mexican side América. He scored the opening goal in the match in the 81st minute of the match to give his side the lead but América would go on to equalize in stoppage time as the match ended 1–1. After the match, Gordillo was named in CONCACAF's best eleven for the Round of 16 first leg matches.

UTC
On 8 January 2021, Gordillo joined Peruvian Liga 1 club UTC. He made his debut with the club on 12 March, in a 1–0 away league defeat against Cienciano. Five days later, on 17 March, Gordillo made his Copa Sudamericana debut in a 1–0 defeat against Sport Huancayo.

Gordillo scored his first goal for UTC on 15 April, opening the scoring in a 3–1 victory over Melgar. His goal and his performance lead to Gordillo being included in the league's team of the week for that round.

Coquimbo Unido
In 6 July 2022, Gordillo moved to Chile and joined Primera División side Coquimbo Unido.

International career
Gordillo made his international debut for Guatemala on 16 October 2019 against Bermuda in an international friendly. He started as the match ended in a 0–0 draw.

Career statistics

Club

International

International goals
Scores and results list Guatemala's goal tally first.

Honours
Antigua 
Liga Nacional de Guatemala: Apertura 2015

References

External links
 
 Profile at PlayMakerStats

1994 births
Living people
People from Guatemala City
Guatemalan footballers
Guatemalan expatriate footballers
Guatemala international footballers
Guatemala youth international footballers
Guatemala under-20 international footballers
Association football defenders
Antigua GFC players
Enosis Neon Paralimni FC players
Deportivo Marquense players
Comunicaciones F.C. players
Universidad Técnica de Cajamarca footballers
Coquimbo Unido footballers
Liga Nacional de Fútbol de Guatemala players
Cypriot First Division players
Peruvian Primera División players
Ecuadorian Serie A players
Chilean Primera División players
Guatemalan expatriate sportspeople in Chile
Expatriate footballers in Cyprus
Expatriate footballers in Italy
Expatriate footballers in Peru
Expatriate footballers in Ecuador
Expatriate footballers in Chile
2021 CONCACAF Gold Cup players